Amazon Studios is an American television and film producer and distributor that is a subsidiary of Amazon. It specializes in developing television series and distributing and producing films. It was started in late 2010. Content is distributed through theaters and Amazon Prime Video, Amazon's digital video streaming service, whose competitors include Netflix and Hulu, among others.

Overview
Scripts for television and films used to be submitted online to Amazon and read by staff; however, the website states they no longer accept submissions. Amazon aimed to review submitted scripts within 90 days (although the process may be longer). If a project was chosen for development, the writer was paid $10,000. If a developed script was selected for distribution as a full-budget movie, the creator was paid $200,000; if it was selected for distribution as a full-budget series, the creator was paid $55,000 as well as "up to 5 percent of Amazon's net receipts from toy and t-shirt licensing, and other royalties and bonuses."

In 2008, Amazon expanded into film production, producing the film The Stolen Child with 20th Century Fox. In July 2015, Amazon announced it had acquired Spike Lee's new film, Chi-Raq, as its first Amazon Original Movie.

Amazon Studios also released its only comic-book series, Blackburn Burrow, in 2012 as a free download. It contained a survey allowing Amazon to collect feedback to determine whether or not it was worthwhile to make the comic into a film.

Amazon Studios had received more than 10,000 feature screenplay submissions as of September 2012 and 2,700 television pilots as of March 2013; 23 films and 26 television series were in active development as of March 2013. In late 2016, it reorganized its film division into Prime Movies.

On July 27, 2017, it was announced that, starting with the December 2017 release Wonder Wheel, Amazon Studios would be its own self-distributing company. Previously, Amazon Studios had relied on multiple external studios to distribute their projects. The company also acquired global TV rights to The Lord of the Rings for $250 million. However, Amazon still has external distribution clients outside of the United States, such as Elevation Pictures in Canada, as well as Warner Bros. and StudioCanal in the UK and France.

In April 2018, Amazon Studios announced that they would no longer accept open submissions of screenplays.

In May 2021, Amazon (parent company of Amazon Studios) entered negotiations to acquire Metro-Goldwyn-Mayer. On May 26, 2021, it was announced that the studio would be acquired by Amazon for $8.45 billion, subject to regulatory approval, continuing to operate as a label alongside Amazon Studios and Amazon Prime Video. The merger was finalized on March 17, 2022. Amazon will continue to partner with United Artists Releasing (MGM and Annapurna Pictures' joint distribution venture), which will continue to operate and release MGM titles theatrically "on a case-by-case basis."

In August 2021, it was reported that Steven Prinz inked an overall TV deal and a first-look deal with the studio. In September 2021, it was reported that Brian Otaño had signed a deal with Amazon Studios. Also in September, Eddie Murphy had signed a first-look film deal with Amazon Studios.

In January 2022, Westbrook signed a multi-year first-look deal with Amazon Studios. That same month, Amazon Studios signed a ten-figure deal with 87North Productions.

In November 2022, it was announced that Jennifer Salke, in addition to Amazon Studios, will be given full control of MGM's film and television divisions, with Brearton stepping down as COO to become the Vice President of PVS Corporate Strategy for MGM+ and MGM Alternative Television.

In December 2022, Intrepid Pictures signed a multi-year overall television deal with Amazon Studios. The studio is one of the largest employers in Culver City with roughly 2,700 staffing their headquarters and production facilities. In January 2023, Critical Role Productions signed a multi-year overall television and first-look film deal with Amazon Studios.

Accolades
In 2015, Transparent was the first show produced by Amazon Studios to win a major award and the first show produced by a streaming media service to win the Golden Globe Award for Best Television Series – Musical or Comedy (a.k.a. "Golden Globe for Best Series"). In 2017, for Manchester by the Sea, Amazon Studios became the first streaming media service to be nominated for the Academy Award for Best Picture; the film was nominated for a total of six Academy Awards, winning two: Best Actor for Casey Affleck and Best Original Screenplay for Kenneth Lonergan. The film The Salesman (2016) won the Academy Award for Best Foreign Language Film; it was directed by Asghar Farhadi and distributed in the US by Amazon Studios. In 2018, the period comedy-drama television series The Marvelous Mrs. Maisel, starring Rachel Brosnahan, won two Golden Globe Awards (Best Television Series – Musical or Comedy and Best Actress – Musical or Comedy for Brosnahan) and five Primetime Emmy Awards, including Outstanding Comedy Series and Outstanding Lead Actress in a Comedy Series for Brosnahan.

Original productions

Television series

Films

References

External links
Official website

Amazon (company)
Film production companies of the United States
Television production companies of the United States
Comic book publishing companies of the United States
Companies based in Santa Monica, California
Companies based in Seattle
Film distributors of the United States
American companies established in 2010
Mass media companies established in 2010